American actor and playwright Chadwick Boseman won many awards for his work and career. 

Boseman achieved international fame with his portrayal of T'Challa in the superhero film Black Panther (2018) and other Marvel Cinematic Universe films, for which he received numerous accolades, including a BET Award, two MTV Movie & TV Awards, a Screen Actors Guild Award shared with the cast, and a posthumous Primetime Emmy Award. He also portrayed real life figures, such as Jackie Robinson in 42 (2013), James Brown in Get On Up (2014), and Thurgood Marshall in Marshall (2017), all of which were nominated at the NAACP Image Awards.

Boseman died of colon cancer on August 28, 2020. His two final films were Spike Lee's Da 5 Bloods and George C. Wolfe's Ma Rainey's Black Bottom. For the latter, he was nominated in the Best Actor category at the Academy Awards, BAFTA Awards, Critics' Choice Movie Awards, Golden Globe Awards, and Screen Actors Guild Awards, becoming the first black performer to ever be nominated posthumously for an Oscar. Boseman is also the actor with most nominations in a single ceremony at the Screen Actors Guild Awards, thanks to his work in Da 5 Bloods and Ma Rainey's Black Bottom.

Major awards

Academy Awards

British Academy Film Awards

Critics' Choice Movie Awards

Golden Globe Awards

Primetime Emmy Awards

Screen Actors Guild Awards

Film juried awards

AACTA Awards

Gotham Independent Film Awards

Independent Spirit Awards

National Board of Review

Satellite Awards

Saturn Awards

Film critics awards

African-American Film Critics Association

Alliance of Women Film Journalists

Boston Society of Film Critics

Chicago Film Critics Association

Dallas–Fort Worth Film Critics Association

Detroit Film Critics Society

Dorian Awards

Dublin Film Critics Circle

Florida Film Critics Circle

Georgia Film Critics Association

Hollywood Critics Association

Houston Film Critics Society Awards

London Film Critics' Circle

Los Angeles Film Critics Association

National Society of Film Critics

New York Film Critics Circle

Online Film Critics Society

San Diego Film Critics Society

San Francisco Bay Area Film Critics Circle

Seattle Film Critics Society

St. Louis Gateway Film Critics Association

Toronto Film Critics Association

Vancouver Film Critics Circle

Washington D.C. Area Film Critics Association

Film festival awards

American Black Film Festival

Hollywood Black Film Festival

Santa Barbara International Film Festival

Theatre awards

AUDELCO Awards

Joseph Jefferson Awards

Miscellaneous awards

BET Awards

Black Reel Awards

MTV Movie & TV Awards

NAACP Image Awards

Nickelodeon Kids' Choice Awards

People's Choice Awards

Teen Choice Awards

Notes

References

Lists of awards received by American actor
Lists of awards received by American musician